The Jewel Palace is a Neo-Gothic-style building in Berlin-Mitte. Designed by the architects Max Jacob and Georg Roensch, the palace was completed in 1898. The name of the building derives from its former function as a trading house, specialized in gold. Surviving World War II without considerable damages, several offices began to house in the Jewel Palace. After the German reunification the palace was essentially renovated.

External links
 "Geschäftshaus Gertraudenstraße", history and data about the Jewel Palace at the official website of the city of Berlin (in German)

Houses completed in 1898
Buildings and structures in Mitte
Palaces in Berlin
Gothic Revival architecture in Germany
1898 establishments in Germany